Puupehe Platform, also known Puu Pehe and in tourist literature as Sweetheart Rock, is a triangular sea stack 150 feet off the peninsula separating Mānele Bay and Hulopoe Bay on the island of Lānai, Hawaii.

Both its Hawaiian and its English name allude to a legend about Pehe, the beautiful daughter of a local chief, whose jealous husband, Makakehau ('Misty Eyes' clouded by her beauty), confined her to a nearby cave facing the open ocean. When a storm arose while he was away fetching fresh water for her, high seas flooded the cave and drowned her before he could return to rescue her. In his grief, he is said to have hauled her body to the top of the rock, where he entombed her before leaping to his own death. However, when the archaeologist Kenneth Emory investigated the "tomb" in detail in 1921, he found no human bones, only those of sea birds, leading him to conclude that the carefully arranged stones were an altar built by either bird hunters or fishermen.

Since 1976, Puu Pehe has marked the boundary between two subzones of the 309-acre Mānele-Hulopoe Marine Life Conservation District designated by the State of Hawaii Division of Aquatic Resources. Subzone B includes Mānele Bay boat harbor, while Subzone A includes Hulopoe Bay, where no motorized vessels are permitted. Both zones contain clear waters and extensive coral reefs that provide excellent snorkeling and Scuba-diving opportunities.

The land surrounding the two bays contains many remnants of earlier Native Hawaiian village sites, whose inhabitants subsisted on dryland farming and offshore fishing. About 28 acres of former Kapihaā village on the rocky shores of Hulopoe Bay below the Mānele Bay Resort golf clubhouse have been preserved and marked with interpretative signs along a trail. The remnants of the village include house platforms, garden terracing, stone tool work sites, a heiau, and a fishing shrine (koa).

Gallery

References

Archaeological sites in Hawaii
Archaeological sites on the National Register of Historic Places in Hawaii
Fishing communities
Buildings and structures in Maui County, Hawaii
Tourist attractions in Maui County, Hawaii
Lanai